Richard Gilliland (January 23, 1950 – March 18, 2021) was an American television and movie actor, best known as JD Shackleford in Designing Women (1986–1992).

Life and career
Gilliland was born in Fort Worth, Texas. He attended high school in Overland Park, Kansas (Shawnee Mission South), graduating in 1968. He was active in plays and musicals. 

He married actress Jean Smart in 1987. They met while working on the set of Designing Women (he played J. D. Shackelford, the boyfriend of Annie Potts' character, Mary Jo Shively). They have two sons, Connor Douglas (born 1989) and Forrest (adopted from China in May 2009).

Gilliland first appeared onscreen in the 1970s. His notable appearances include The Waltons, Thirtysomething, Party of Five, Little Women, and a recurring role on Designing Women (where he met Smart, who starred as Charlene in that series). He played Ellis Kapp on The Unit and Captain Stan Cotter on 24. He also had a recurring role as serial killer Jeffrey Speidel in the NBC series Matlock.

Gilliland played Captain Stan Cotter on 24 during season five, while his wife Jean Smart played First Lady Martha Logan in the same season.

He died following a short illness in Los Angeles, California, on March 18, 2021, at the age of 71.

Select TV and filmography

The Streets of San Francisco (1974) (TV series)
Bug (1975)
Stay Hungry (1976)
McMillan (1976–77) (TV series)
The White Buffalo (1977)
Operation Petticoat (1977–78) (TV series)
Little Women (1978) (TV miniseries)
The Waltons (1981) (TV series)
Airplane II: The Sequel (1982)
The Night the Bridge Fell Down (1983) (TV movie)
Just Our Luck (1983) (TV series)
Challenge of a Lifetime (1985) (TV movie)
The Love Boat (1985) (TV series)
Mary (1986) (TV series)
Designing Women (1986–91) (TV series)
Hunter (1987) (TV series)
Heartland (1989) (TV series)
Thirtysomething (1989–90) (TV series)
Murder, She Wrote (1991, 93) (TV series)
Matlock (1991, '93, '95) (TV series)
Winnetka Road (1994) (TV series)
Touched by an Angel (1996) (TV series)
Dark Skies (1996–97) (TV series)
Early Edition (1997) (TV series)
Star Kid (1997)
Brooklyn South (1998) (TV series)
The Practice (1998) (TV series)
Party of Five (1997, '98) (TV series)
Judging Amy (2000) (TV series)
Becker (2001) (TV series)
Vampire Clan (2002)
Joan of Arcadia (2003) (TV series)
Crossing Jordan (2004) (TV series)
24 (2006) (TV series)
The Unit (2007) (TV series)
Dexter (2009) (TV series)
Desperate Housewives (2010) (TV series)
Torchwood (2011) (TV series)
Imposters (2017–18) (TV series)
Case 347 (2020) (Movie)

References

External links

1950 births
2021 deaths
20th-century American male actors
21st-century American male actors
American male film actors
American male television actors
DePaul University alumni
Male actors from Fort Worth, Texas